Dr. Natesan Ramani (15 October 1934 – 9 October 2015), commonly known as N. Ramani or N. Flute Ramani, was an Indian Carnatic flautist. He was awarded the Madras Music Academy's Sangeetha Kalanidhi in 1996. Ramani is also credited with introducing the long flute into Carnatic music.

Early life and background
Ramani was born in Tiruvarur, a city in Tamil Nadu which is honored by its association with the Trinity of Carnatic music. Ramani was born into a family of flautists. Ramani first learnt music from his grandfather, Sri Aazhiyur Narayanaswami Iyer, a well known flute artist and singer himself. Aware of young Ramani's keen interest in the Carnatic flute, Ramani's initiation to Carnatic music began at the age of five.

Ramani performed his first concert at the age of 8. The turning point in Ramani's career was when he became a disciple of his maternal uncle and eminent flautist, the late T. R. Mahalingam (known more commonly as "Flute Mali"), who first popularised the Carnatic flute in Indian music. By the age of 11 years, his first concert was held at Singaravelavar Temple, Sikkil, near Nagapattinam, Tamil Nadu. His mother Smt Sarathambal was instrumental in bringing him to notice. She accompanied him for his concerts when he was studying at Boys High School Tiruvarur.  Ramani accompanied his guru T. R. Mahalingam in a concert for the first time. N Ramani is related to Sikkil Sisters, his contemporary flute-playing duo.

Career
In 1945, Ramani performed his first concert on All India Radio. Following Ramani's first concert at the Madras Music Academy in 1956, at the age of 22, Ramani had reached the highest point in his career and become an artist of international fame, and his concerts became a regular feature.

Disciples
Ramani started the "Ramani Academy of Flute", and has trained more than 100 disciples. namely:

Tours
Ramani performed in all major states, sabhas and venues throughout India, as well as numerous destinations around the world, including the United States, Canada, France, Germany, Switzerland, Sri Lanka and other countries. He made more than 30 concert tours outside of India.

Origin of the Carnatic flute 
Until the late 19th century, the Carnatic flute (better known in Kannada as venu or murali or kolalu, in Telugu as pillanagrovi and in Tamil and Malayalam as pullanguzhal), an 8-hole bamboo flute, the South Indian equivalent of the North Indian 6-hole bansuri flute, had never been used in Carnatic concerts as a main instrument. Sharaba Shastri has been characterised by his followers as a musical genius after experimenting and creating the Carnatic flute. He is also known for bringing the Carnatic flute to the fore of Carnatic music concerts as an influential instrument.

The Sharaba Shastri style or bani of playing was established and was carried on by his disciple Sanjeeva Rao. However it was the self-taught "Mali" who brought a revolution in popularising the Carnatic flute and whose legacy was carried on by Ramani and other national and international disciples of Mali.

Achievements 
Although Palladam Sanjeeva Rao was Sharaba Shastri's successor, it was "Mali" and N. Ramani who brought international attention to the Carnatic flute both in their own distinct flute playing techniques, with the latter improving on the former's methods.

He did so by studying the long bass flutes of the North Indian bansuri genius, Pannalal Ghosh which the latter had incorporated successfully in Hindustani concerts. To further enhance tala dynamics, he followed the "GNB" style which was developed by the legendary G. N. Balasubramaniam. An interview with the Hindu

The "Mali" bani encompassed facial expressions such as slight tilting of the head, varied movement of the lips which produced the vocal effect in the Carnatic never explored before by Sharaba Shastri or Palladam Sanjeeva Rao.

Bringing out more of the tradition Mali introduced in the playing of the Carnatic flute, Ramani's distinctive style is the transformation of the Carnatic flute into the voice of a proficient Carnatic vocalist. Stressing such importance on the emphasis of vocal style of playing, he displayed characteristics of the human voice in his concerts often observed in his fast-paced yet melodious performances.  According to Ramani, "Mali's teaching methods were worth emulating. A good teacher should be open to learning from his students too. Mali learnt Aahiri raga from me, which I had learnt from T. Vishwanathan, Balasaraswathi's brother".

In 1996, he gained the most prestigious title/award in Carnatic music, Sangeetha Kalanidhi.

Honours and accolades 
Ramani's performances in All India Radio (AIR) have received numerous praises from Hindustani and Carnatic musicians alike and his performances overseas had been recognised with numerous awards.

Some of the highlights include the Sangeetha Kalanidhi, awarded by the Music Academy in Chennai, Tamil Nadu, India, the Sangeetha Kalasikhamani award for the year 2007 given by The Indian Fine arts Society, Chennai, the Sangeetha Acharya award from Wasser College, US, the honorary citizenship status in Maryland, Ohio, US, and the Padma Shri Award from the President of India.  He holds an honorary Cultural Doctorate from The World University of Arizona.

N. Ramani was conferred with Sangeet Natak Akademi Award in 1984 and Sangeet Natak Akademi Tagore Ratna in 2011.

Death 
Ramani suffered from throat cancer during the last years of his life, and did not appear in many programmes. He died on 9 October 2015 in Mylapore, less than a week short of his 81st birthday. He was survived by four children, including Thiagarajan Ramani.

Discography
Contributing artist
 The Rough Guide to the Music of India and Pakistan (1996, World Music Network)

References

External links 
MusicIndiaOnline
IndiaMusicInfo – Official Biography
Chowdiah & Parvathi Blogspot.com

1934 births
2015 deaths
Venu players
Recipients of the Padma Shri in arts
Tamil musicians
Indian flautists
Deaths from cancer in India
Recipients of the Sangeet Natak Akademi Award